Robert Bruce Fairbairn (born February 19, 1947) is an American film and television actor. He is known for playing for Officer Chris Owens in the American police procedural television series The Rookies.

Life and career
Fairbairn worked at a restaurant while he studied acting. He began his career in 1974, where Fairbairn replaced actor, Michael Ontkean in The Rookies. From 1974-1976, he played Officer Chris Owens  in the American police procedural television series The Rookies. 

On September 9, 1975, Fairbairn was arrested for drunk driving in Los Angeles, California, for which he paid the fine.

After The Rookies ended in 1976, Fairbairn guest-starred in television programs including Knight Rider, Matt Houston, Remington Steele, The Trials of Rosie O'Neill, Baywatch, The Incredible Hulk, Matlock, Simon & Simon and Charlie's Angels. He also appeared in four films: Cyclone, Vampire Hookers (as "Tom Buckley"), 3 Strikes, The Hanoi Hilton. Fairbairn played the recurring role of "Sheldon Ganz" in the legal drama television series L.A. Law, and also played Ray Geary in the soap opera Knots Landing.

References

External links 

Rotten Tomatoes profile

1947 births
Living people
Place of birth missing (living people)
American male film actors
American male television actors
American male soap opera actors
20th-century American male actors